Write On may refer to:

 Write On (TV series), an educational television show which was produced and broadcast by TVOntario
 Write On (album), a 1976 album by The Hollies

See also
Right On (disambiguation)
Righton (surname)
Ryton (disambiguation)